Live in Reykjavik, Iceland is the first live compilation album by This Will Destroy You. It was released on October 29, 2013.

Track listing

Personnel
This Will Destroy You
 Jeremy Galindo - guitar
 Donovan Jones - bass guitar, keyboard
 Chris King - guitar
 Alex Bhore - drums

References

2013 live albums
This Will Destroy You albums